Nikolay Davydenko was the defending champion, and won in the final 7–5, 7–6(11–9), against Paul-Henri Mathieu.

Seeds

Draw

Finals

Top half

Bottom half

External links
Draw
Qualifying draw

Kremlin Cup
Kremlin Cup